Downhead is a village and civil parish close to Leigh-on-Mendip and  north east of Shepton Mallet, in the Mendip district of Somerset, England. The parish includes the medieval settlement of Tadhill.

History

South west of the village is Dinies Camp, an univallate Iron Age hill fort enclosure. The hill fort is considered to be medieval as it is on the site of earlier earthwork.

The parish of Downhead was part of the Whitstone Hundred.

The village was recorded as Dunehevede, meaning the top of the down, in 1196. The manor was given to Glastonbury Abbey by King Æthelwulf of Wessex, but by 1066 was held under the abbey by Erneis. By the early 18th century the estate was held by the Portmans of Orchard Portman.

Downhead Basalt Quarry to the west of the village, opened before 1904 and ceased Basalt mining in 1925. It was serviced by a  narrow gauge railway.

Governance

The parish council has responsibility for local issues, including setting an annual precept (local rate) to cover the council's operating costs and producing annual accounts for public scrutiny. The parish council evaluates local planning applications and works with the local police, district council officers, and neighbourhood watch groups on matters of crime, security, and traffic. The parish council's role also includes initiating projects for the maintenance and repair of parish facilities, as well as consulting with the district council on the maintenance, repair, and improvement of highways, drainage, footpaths, public transport, and street cleaning. Conservation matters (including trees and listed buildings) and environmental issues are also the responsibility of the council.

The village falls within the Non-metropolitan district of Mendip, which was formed on 1 April 1974 under the Local Government Act 1972, having previously been part of Shepton Mallet Rural District, which is responsible for local planning and building control, local roads, council housing, environmental health, markets and fairs, refuse collection and recycling, cemeteries and crematoria, leisure services, parks, and tourism.

Somerset County Council is responsible for running the largest and most expensive local services such as education, social services, libraries, main roads, public transport, policing and fire services, trading standards, waste disposal and strategic planning.

It is also part of the Somerton and Frome county constituency represented in the House of Commons of the Parliament of the United Kingdom. It elects one member of parliament by the first past the post system of election, and was part of the South West England constituency of the European Parliament prior to Britain leaving the European Union in January 2020, which elected seven MEPs using the d'Hondt method of party-list proportional representation.

Geography

It is close to the Asham Wood biological Site of Special Scientific Interest which is the largest and most diverse of the ancient semi-natural woods in the Mendip Hills. It has been the subject of controversy and attempts to protect the environment from increased quarrying activity in the area, particularly at Torr Works which is also known as Merehead Quarry. The wood occupies 2 deep valleys and the intervening plateau. Most of the underlying rocks are calcareous Carboniferous Limestone and Shales, but Devonian Portishead Beds outcrop along the northern valley. There are a range of unusual flora and fauna.

Religious sites

All Saints church is a Grade II* listed building with a 14th-century tower and 18th-century nave and chancel. The church tower contains three bells cast in 1782 by William Bilbie of Chew Stoke. In 2007 funding from the levy on nearby quarries was obtained to pay for repair and restoration work on the bells.

References

External links

Villages in Mendip District
Civil parishes in Somerset